The Algerian Handball Championship or the National 1 is the premier professional handball league in Algeria. It started in 1962 and 14 teams participate in the league.

Champions 

 Notes:
* The 2011-2012 season was canceled by the Algerian Court of Sports Disputes
* The 2019-2020 season was being cantinued in 2021
MC Alger : ex. MP Alger & GS Pétroliers
OC Alger: ex. CS DNC Alger & IRB Alger
RC Kouba: ex. CSS Kouba & NAR Alger
MC Oran: ex. MP Oran
CR Belouizdad: ex. CR Belcourt
Hamra Annaba: ex. USM Annaba

Most successful clubs

Current teams
These are the teams that participate in the 2021–22 Algerian Handball Championship season: Nine clubs promoted from the second division.

See also 
 Algerian Handball Cup

References

External links 
 FAHB official website
 1st Algerian handball website - dzhand.net

Algeria
Handball competitions in Algeria
Handball